The California Polytechnic State University football team plane crash occurred on October 29, 1960, at 22:02 EST near Toledo, Ohio. The aircraft, a veteran of World War II, was carrying the Cal Poly Mustangs college football team. Of the 48 on board, 22 were killed, including both pilots, 16 players, a student manager, and a Cal Poly football booster.

Investigation 

Prior to takeoff the weather at the airport steadily deteriorated: at 7 p.m. the visibility was 3/4-mile (1.2 km); down to 1/16-mile (100 m) at 8:37 p.m.; and zero at the time of the accident, 22:02 EST.  The CAB accident report states that stemming from the crash, the Federal Aviation Administration (FAA) published a notice in the Airman's Guide that prohibited takeoff for commercial aircraft when the visibility is below 1/4 mile (400 m), or the runway visual range is below .

In its final report, the CAB Probable Cause statement was "The accident was due to loss of control during a premature lift-off. Contributing factors were the overweight aircraft, weather conditions, and partial loss of power in the left engine."

Aftermath 
The pilot who made the decision to take off was flying on a certificate that had been revoked, but he was allowed to fly pending an appeal. Following the crash, the Arctic-Pacific Company lost its certificate to charter airplanes.

Among the survivors was quarterback Ted Tollner, later the head coach at USC and San Diego State. At the time of the crash, Bowling Green State had been the easternmost opposing school ever to play football against Cal Poly. The university canceled the final three games of the 1960 season.

Hall of Fame coach John Madden, a Cal Poly alumnus who played for the Mustangs during the 1957 and 1958 seasons, had a fear of flying, which was commonly attributed to the crash, although he said it instead stemmed from claustrophobia. Madden was coaching at the nearby Allan Hancock Junior College at the time of the crash and knew many passengers aboard the aircraft.

As a result of the crash, Cal Poly did not play any road games outside California until 1969, a 14–0 loss at Montana in Missoula.  Cal Poly did not play another game east of the Rocky Mountains until 1978, a 17–0 loss to Winston-Salem State in North Carolina in the NCAA Division II playoffs. They did not play another regular season game east of the Rockies until 1989, a 45–20 loss to Angelo State in Texas.

Two weeks afterward, LIFE Magazine published an article, "Campus Overwhelmed by Team's Tragic Flight".

In April 2001, the tragedy was examined in an ESPN Outside the Lines monthly special focusing on the evolution and frequency of travel in collegiate and pro sports. The segment, entitled "Have Game, Will Travel," included an interview with Tollner conducted by Lisa Salters.

Mercy Bowl 
In the following season on Thanksgiving Day 1961, Los Angeles County Supervisor Warren Dorn and Bob Hope sponsored a "Mercy Bowl" in the Los Angeles Memorial Coliseum between Fresno State and Bowling Green State to raise a memorial fund for the survivors and bereaved families. The event raised about $200,000 from a crowd of 33,000 on November 23. Fresno State defeated Bowling Green in the game, 36–6.

In 2008 interviews with ESPN, several former Cal Poly players expressed interest in seeing the Mercy Bowl return for various contemporary charitable causes. Similar sentiments were expressed in a 2012 ESPN story about the game potentially returning in relation to other modern bowl games.

Campus memorials at Cal Poly 

There are memorial plaques for the crash on the Cal Poly campus at Mott Gym and the Mustang horse statue. A permanent memorial plaza opened with the new Alex G. Spanos Stadium. The memorial has 18 copper pillars, one for each of the Cal Poly-affiliated individuals who died in the crash. Each pillar rises to the height of the person honored and is adorned with a plaque about that individual's life.

On September 29, 2006, the 1960 football team was inducted into the Cal Poly Athletics Hall of Fame.  The following night, former players and members of the crash victims' families stood at mid-field of Spanos Stadium during a halftime memorial.

See also 
 List of accidents involving sports teams

References

External links 
 
 
 
 
 
 Mustang Memorial Plaza (PDF) – Dedication ceremony photos

Cal Poly Mustangs football
Aviation accidents and incidents in the United States in 1960
Airliner accidents and incidents in Ohio
History of Toledo, Ohio
Lucas County, Ohio
1960 in sports in California
1960 in sports in Ohio
1960 in California
1960 in Ohio
October 1960 events in the United States
Aviation accidents and incidents involving sports teams
Accidents and incidents involving the Curtiss-Wright C-46 Commando
Transportation in Toledo, Ohio